Wilhelmus Edwin Gorter (born 6 July 1963) is a Dutch former professional footballer who played as a midfielder.

Early and personal life
Born in The Hague, Gorter's mother died when he was 8 years old.

Gorter has two children, including son Donny who is also a professional footballer. His other child is a daughter, Sharon. Gorter has described himself as a "stern but fair" father.

Playing career
Gorter played for RVC, DS'79, Roda JC, Lugano, Caen, Lommel, Utrecht, Vitesse Arnhem, NAC Breda, the New England Revolution and the Miami Fusion.

While playing in Switzerland for FC Lugano, Gorter won the Foreigner of the Year award for the 1990–91 season.

In 1994, while playing for FC Utrecht, Gorter attempted to gouge the eyes of opposition player Björn van der Doelen, receiving a seven-match ban as a result. He left the club at the end of that season.

He moved to the United States in February 1998, playing in Major League Soccer for  the New England Revolution and the Miami Fusion.

Later career
After he retired from playing football, Gorter became a player's agent. He later worked as a television analyst for Eredivisie Live, and as a regional distributor for Cambridge België health products.

References

1963 births
Living people
Dutch footballers
FC Dordrecht players
Roda JC Kerkrade players
FC Lugano players
Stade Malherbe Caen players
K.F.C. Lommel S.K. players
FC Utrecht players
SBV Vitesse players
NAC Breda players
New England Revolution players
Miami Fusion players
Eerste Divisie players
Eredivisie players
Ligue 1 players
Belgian Pro League players
Major League Soccer players
Association football midfielders
Dutch expatriate footballers
Dutch expatriate sportspeople in Switzerland
Expatriate footballers in Switzerland
Dutch expatriate sportspeople in France
Expatriate footballers in France
Dutch expatriate sportspeople in Belgium
Expatriate footballers in Belgium
Dutch expatriate sportspeople in the United States
Expatriate soccer players in the United States
Footballers from The Hague